The Subdivisions of the canton of Solothurn include:
 5 electoral districts
 10 districts
 125 municipalities

See also 
 Districts of Switzerland
 Municipalities of the canton of Solothurn